Rachid Ghanmouni (born 10 April 1978) is a Moroccan long-distance runner.

He was born in Rich, Errachidia. He finished thirteenth in the marathon race at the 2003 World Championships in a personal best time of 2:10:56 hours. He also competed at the 2004 Olympic Games, but did not finish. He finished 27th at the 2003 World Half Marathon Championships and 34th at the 2004 World Half Marathon Championships.

His personal best times are 2:09:11 in the marathon, achieved in April 2006 in the Paris Marathon; and 1:01:36 hours in the half marathon, achieved in April 2003 in Safi.

In October 2006 he was to be tested for doping in Formiguères, but fled from the site. He was subject to a two-year suspension in January 2008, and after he lost a legal battle the suspension was upheld. The suspension expired in March 2010.

Achievements
All results regarding marathon, unless stated otherwise

References

1978 births
Living people
Moroccan male long-distance runners
Athletes (track and field) at the 2004 Summer Olympics
Olympic athletes of Morocco
Doping cases in athletics
Moroccan sportspeople in doping cases
Moroccan male marathon runners
20th-century Moroccan people
21st-century Moroccan people